Kadikara Manithargal is a 2018 Indian Tamil language drama thriller film written and directed by Vaigarai Balan on his directorial debut and produced by Pradeep Jose. The film stars Kishore and Latha Rao in the lead roles while Karunakaran, Bala Singh, and Vasu Vikram play pivotal roles in the film. The music for the film is scored by Sam C. S. The film was released on 3 August 2018 after a long production delay lasted for 2 years and received mixed reviews from the audience upon release.

Plot 
The story revolves around Maran (Kishore), who works in a bakery. He and his wife (Latha Rao) are searching for a house to rent. A shady broker (Scissor Manohar) gets Maran a house under his budget, but he has to face the sanctions of the house owner (Bala Singh) if he wants to stay in the house. The house owner will only allow a family of four, but Maran has three children, making it five members in his family, including him and his wife. Maran has no other option, so he lies to the house owner and hides one of his kids in the box which he uses to load his bakery goods.

Cast

Production 
The production of the film was commenced in early 2016 by debutant director Vaigarai Balan. The production team also roped in Sam CS as the music director of the film. The trailer of the film was released in the year 2016.

Release 
The film was initially scheduled to be released in around late 2017 but delayed before its original release on 3 August 2018, a day where 11 other Tamil films also clashed at the box office. This is also the first instance in Tamil cinema history in which at least 10 films are scheduled to hit the screens on the same day.

Soundtrack 
The music for the film is composed by Sam CS and the songs received positive reviews from the audience. The soundtrack of the movie was released on 19 December 2016 and consists of 4 songs. The lyrics were penned by music composer Sam CS, late lyricist expert Na. Muthukumar and Karki Bhava.

References 

2018 directorial debut films
2010s Tamil-language films
Indian thriller drama films
Indian films about revenge
Films scored by Sam C. S.
2018 thriller drama films